, also known as , is a retired long-distance runner from Japan. He won the 1985 edition of the Fukuoka Marathon, clocking 2:09:51 on December 1, 1985. He represented his native country at the 1988 Summer Olympics, finishing in 17th place (2:15:42).

Competition record

External links
 1985 Year Ranking
 

1957 births
Living people
Place of birth missing (living people)
Japanese male long-distance runners
Japanese male marathon runners
Japanese male steeplechase runners
Olympic male marathon runners
Olympic athletes of Japan
Athletes (track and field) at the 1984 Summer Olympics
Athletes (track and field) at the 1988 Summer Olympics
Asian Games gold medalists for Japan
Asian Games silver medalists for Japan
Asian Games gold medalists in athletics (track and field)
Asian Games medalists in athletics (track and field)
Athletes (track and field) at the 1978 Asian Games
Athletes (track and field) at the 1982 Asian Games
Athletes (track and field) at the 1986 Asian Games
Medalists at the 1978 Asian Games
Medalists at the 1982 Asian Games
Medalists at the 1986 Asian Games
Japan Championships in Athletics winners
20th-century Japanese people